Delilah is a female Biblical figure. 

Delilah, or Delila, also may refer to:

People
 Delilah (given name)
 Delilah (radio host), American radio personality Delilah Rene (born 1960)
 Delilah (musician), British singer-songwriter Paloma Ayana Stoecker (born 1990)
 Sophie Delila, London-based French recording artist, songwriter, musician and producer

Arts and entertainment

Music
 Delilah (Tom Jones album), 1968
 Delilah (Anderson East album), 2015
 "Delilah" (Florence and the Machine song), 2015
 "Delilah" (Queen song), 1991
 "Delilah" (Tom Jones song), 1968
 "Delilah", a song by The Cranberries from Bury the Hatchet
 "Delilah", a song by The Dresden Dolls from the 2006 album Yes, Virginia...
 "Delilah", a song by Mavado
 "Delilah", a jazz standard based on the theme song to the 1949 film Samson and Delilah by Victor Young, featured on the 1954 album Clifford Brown & Max Roach
 "Hey There Delilah" (Plain White T's song), 2005

Books and television
 Delilah (novel), a 1941 novel by Marcus Goodrich revolving around a fictional US Navy destroyer named Delilah
 Delilah (American TV series)
 Delilah (Canadian TV series), a 1973–1974 Canadian sitcom
 Delilah (comics), a Marvel Comics character, an enemy of Spider-Man
 Del Dingle (Delilah "Del" Dingle), a fictional character in the British soap opera Emmerdale
 Delilah, in the animated series Delilah & Julius
 Delilah, a horse in the TV series Steptoe and Son
 Delilah, a character in works by American novelist Barry Eisler

Technology
 Delilah (missile), developed by Israel Military Industries
 Delilah, a secure speech device co-developed by Alan Turing
 Delilah, nickname of the Norsk Data ND-120/CX processor

Other uses
 Delilah (beetle), a genus of longhorn beetles
 White Lady (cocktail), also known as a Delilah
 560 Delila, an asteroid

See also
 Dalilah (disambiguation)
 Delilia, a genus of flowering plants